Atomariinae is a subfamily of silken fungus beetles in the family Cryptophagidae. There are about 8 genera and more than 170 described species in Atomariinae.

Genera
These eight genera belong to the subfamily Atomariinae:
 Amydropa Reitter, 1877
 Atomaria Stephens, 1829
 Curelius Casey, 1900
 Ephistemus Stephens, 1829
 Hypocoprus Motschoulsky, 1839
 Hypophagus Lyubarsky, 1989
 Parephistemus Casey, 1924
 Tisactia Casey, 1900

References

Further reading

External links

 

Cucujoidea